Balada pro banditu (English: A Ballad for a Bandit) is a Czech stage musical play and film with music by Miloš Štědroň and screenplay by Milan Uhde.

Story 
Songs by camp fire based on the novel Nikola Šuhaj loupežník (The Bandit Nikola Šuhaj) by Ivan Olbracht. Actors sing to guitar accompaniment the song "Guy from Kolochava".

Film 
 Directed by Vladimír Sís.
 Nikola Šuhaj .... Miroslav Donutil
 Erzsika .... Iva Bittová
 Morana .... Blanka Rudová
 Erzsika's father .... František Derfler
 Erzsika's brother .... Martin Havelka
 Nikola's brother .... Petr Maláč
 Mageri ..... Bolek Polívka
 Chief Policeman .... Jiří Pecha
 Derbak .... Pavel Zatloukal
 Derbaková .... Evelyna Steimarová
 Danko .... Vladimír Hauser
 Uhrín .... Daniel Dítě
 Morana's sister .... Michaela Dudová
 Morana's sister .... Alice Hásová
 Gravedigger .... Rudy Kovanda
 Kubeš .... Pavel Nový
 František Kocourek
 Gustav Opočenský
 Greenhorns

Premiere cast - Divadlo Husa na Provázku, Brno 
 Directed by Zdeněk Pospíšil. The play had its première in Spring 1975.
 Nikola Šuhaj .... Miroslav Donutil
 Erzsika .... Iva Bittová
 Morana .... Blanka Rudová
 Erzsika's father .... František Derfler
 Erzsika's brother .... Martin Havelka
 Nikola's brother .... Petr Maláč
 Mageri ..... Bolek Polívka
 Chief Policeman .... Jiří Pecha
 Derbak .... Pavel Zatloukal
 Derbaková .... Evelyna Steimarová
 Danko .... Vladimír Hauser
 Uhrín .... Daniel Dítě
 Morana's sister .... Michaela Dudová
 Morana's sister .... Alice Hásová
 Gravedigger .... Rudy Kovanda
 Kubeš .... Pavel Nový
 František Kocourek
 Gustav Opočenský
 Greenhorns

Divadlo Šumperk 
 Directed by Ondrej Elbel. The premiere took place on 31 October 2009 in 7:30 p.m. in theatre in Šumperk.
 Nikola Šohaj .... Václav Vítek
 Erzsika .... Lenka Koštáková
 Morana .... Olga Kaštická
 Mageri .... Petr Komínek
 Derbak .... Jiří Bartoň
 Oreb Danko, Jura Šohaj .... Vojtěch Lipina
 Commander of Police Officer's .... Lukáš Matěj
 Andrej, Kubeš, Icu Šohaj .... Jan Kroneisl
 Drač, gendarme Bouda .... Petr Král
 Granny Derbaková .... Bohdana Pavlíková
 Mrs. Derbaková's daughter, a girl of Kolochava .... Vendula Fialová
 Mailman, gendarme .... Jiří Konečný
 Gendarme .... Pavel Orság

Songs 
Zabili, zabili (They killed, They killed)
Křížem, krážem (Crisscross)
Tmavá nocka (The Dark Night)
Ani tak nehoří (Not So Much Burn)
Nepůjdu od tebe (I will not go from you)
Šibeničky (Small Gallows)
Nebudu orat ani set
Pod javorem (Under the Maple)
Tam u řeky na kraji
Tam na hoře (Up There)
Pojďme chlapci pojďme krást
Kamarádi moji (My Friends)
 Večer mizí
Chodí horou 300 ovec
Dobrý večer nám (Good Evening Us)
Jatelinka dobrá
Stavěli, stavěli
Řekněte mamce, prokrista (Tell mum, for Christ's sake)

References

External links 
 Czechoslovak Film Database
 I-Divadlo.cz
 
 Theatre Šumperk

Czech plays
Czech musical films
Czech musicals
Off-Broadway musicals
1970s musical films
1975 musicals